The Livonia Hockey Association (LHA) is an amateur hockey league located in Livonia, Michigan.  It is a part of Michigan Amateur Hockey Association (MAHA) and resides within MAHA’s district four.  The LHA is one of the largest amateur hockey associations in Michigan.  The LHA is housed out of Eddie Edgar Arena, with additional ice available at Devonaire Arena, both located in Livonia.  In addition to the LHA, Livonia Public Schools’ three high schools also host practices and games out of Eddie Edgar.

Divisions
In addition to Mini-Mite through Midget BB house leagues, Livonia has travel teams in Squirt A through Midget divisions as well as a girls travel division.  The current divisions for girls are 8U, 10U, 12U, 14U, and 16U.  All girls and travel teams play under the name Livonia Knights and all of their house teams are known as the Livonia Lancers.

Girls Hockey in Livonia
During the 2000-2001 season, the LHA introduced the association’s first girls team, a 10U division.  Seeing the growing interest of girls hockey, the next year the league introduced a 12U and the now defunct 15U division.  In 2003, after the USA Hockey changed the age divisions to more closely match their Canadian counterparts, the LHA decided to drop the 15U down to 14U.  The following season the LHA introduced the 16U team. LHA has had a rich history of supporting girls hockey in and around Livonia and now (as of 2020) has girls teams at IP/6U/LTP, and 8-19U.

Board of directors
The current executive board of directors are Mike Featherngill (President), Brad Larsh (Vice-President), Chris White (Secretary), and Josh Goldstein (Treasurer).

References

External links
 Livonia Hockey Association
http://www.eddieedgar.org/

Amateur ice hockey
Youth ice hockey
Women's ice hockey leagues in the United States
Ice hockey in Michigan
Livonia, Michigan
Women's sports in Michigan